Aaron Blunck (born April 12, 1996) is an American  freestyle skier from Crested Butte, Colorado.

Career
Blunck competed in the men's halfpipe event at the 2014 Winter Olympics in Sochi, Russia.  He qualified for the final, where he placed seventh out of 12 competitors.

Blunck won the gold medal at the 2017 Winter X Games in Aspen in the men's superpipe.

During the summer, Blunck can be found at Mt. Hood, Oregon, where he hosts a Takeover Session at Windells Camp.

Allegations against Twitter and Western media
According to the South China Morning Post, Blunck alleged that he was suspended by Twitter after he praised the 2022 Beijing Olympics. He reposted a fan's comment that read: "Aaron Blunck [is] out here telling the truth and getting punished by his own government." He later also shared a commentator's tweet accusing the US government of causing his account to be shut down: "Twitter has executed the order of the Western ruling cabals... Punishment comes pretty fast." In his Instagram post, he tagged Twitter and asked: "What'd I do?"

Prior to his allegation, he had criticized Western media's negative coverage of the event, saying, "I didn't really know what to expect, being stateside you've kind of heard some pretty bad media, and that is completely false – it's actually been phenomenal", adding that "Everybody – from staff to Covid testers, to accommodation – it's probably, honestly, one of the better Olympics that we've been to".

However, it was revealed that the account had been suspended in September of the previous year, over five months prior to the games. Twitter responded to the allegations saying that the account had been suspended in error and had since been recovered.

References

External links

1996 births
Living people
American male freestyle skiers
Olympic freestyle skiers of the United States
Freestyle skiers at the 2012 Winter Youth Olympics
Youth Olympic bronze medalists for the United States
Freestyle skiers at the 2014 Winter Olympics
Freestyle skiers at the 2018 Winter Olympics
Freestyle skiers at the 2022 Winter Olympics
People from Englewood, Colorado
X Games athletes